This article lists diplomatic missions resident in the Kingdom of Belgium. This listing excludes honorary consulates.

At present, the capital city of Brussels hosts 185 embassies. Brussels is unique in that it is not only the seat of the Belgian Government, but also of the European Commission, which is the executive wing of the European Union to which countries accredit representatives, and of the NATO. Thus, a country can send up to three ambassadors to Brussels: one to Belgium, one to the EU, and one to the NATO. Some embassies serve all three functions, while other countries open separate embassies for each, or combine any two of the functions in one embassy.

Diplomatic missions in Brussels

Embassies

Embassies to open

Delegations/Missions to the European Union

Other missions or delegations
 (Kingdom of Denmark) - Representative Office
  (Kingdom of Denmark) - Representative Office
 (Hong Kong Economic and Trade Office)
  (Representative Office)
 (Macau Economic and Trade Office)
 (Representative Office)
 (Representative Office)
 (Canada) - General Delegation
 (Delegation)
 (Taipei Representative Office in the EU and Belgium)

Gallery

Consulates General/Consulates 

Antwerp

Charleroi

Liège

Non-resident embassies

Resident in New York City, United States:

Resident in Washington D.C., United States:

Resident elsewhere:
 (Paris)
 (Avarua)
 (The Hague)
 (Berlin)
 (Stockholm)
 (London)

Closed missions

See also 
 Foreign relations of Belgium
 List of diplomatic missions of Belgium
 Visa requirements for Belgian citizens

Notes

References

External links 
 Belgian Diplomatic List
 Missions to NATO and National Mission or Delegation to NATO
 Consulates in Belgium

 
Belgium
Belgium diplomacy-related lists